The Madonna and the Soldier (Russian: «Мадонна и солдат», Madonna i soldat, Op. 105) is an opera by Mieczysław Weinberg to a libretto by  composed in 1970. The Madonna and the Soldier was Weinberg's second opera, following The Passenger and preceding Dartagnan's Love. Shostakovich in reviewing these three first operas, wrote of the composer that "in turning to this new genre, Weinberg has shown himself to be a mature master of the operatic form."

References

1970 operas
Compositions by Mieczysław Weinberg
Russian-language operas
Operas